The 1968 United States presidential election in Louisiana was held on November 5, 1968, as part of the 1968 United States presidential election. Along with four other contiguous southern states, former and future Alabama Governor George Wallace won the state for the American Party by a large margin against Democrat Hubert Humphrey and Republican Richard Nixon. , this is the last election in which Jefferson Parish, St. Tammany Parish, Lafayette Parish, Ouachita Parish, Bossier Parish, Union Parish, and LaSalle Parish did not vote for the Republican presidential candidate.

With 48.32% of the popular vote, Louisiana would prove to be Wallace's third strongest state after Alabama and Mississippi.  This marked the most recent election cycle in which a Republican would win the presidency without carrying Louisiana.

Results

Results by parish

See also
 United States presidential elections in Louisiana

Notes

References

1968 Louisiana elections
1968
Louisiana